Vumbachigwe is a village and mine in the province of Matabeleland South, Zimbabwe. According to the 1982 Population Census, the village had a population of 2,077. The village grew up as the residential and commercial centre for the employees of the Vumbachigwegold mine.

Populated places in Matabeleland South Province
Gold mines in Zimbabwe